Cristhian Alexis Árabe Pedraza (born 25 December 1991) is a Bolivian footballer who plays for Oriente Petrolero in the Bolivian Primera División.

Career
Arabe started at Club Blooming and also previously played for Club Destroyers. He joined Oriente Petrolero from Club Always Ready in July 2022, having been with Always Ready since 2015.

International career
On 3 March, 2019 Arabe made his debut for the Bolivia national football team against Nicaragua.

References

External links
 
 Cristhian Árabe at footballdatabase.eu

Living people
1991 births
Bolivian footballers
Bolivia international footballers
Association football midfielders
Club Always Ready players
Bolivian Primera División players